A Change of Sex is a multi-part television documentary about English trans woman Julia Grant. The first chapter, initially titled George, premiered on BBC2 in 1979. It is one of the first documentary films about transgender issues.

BBC2 repeated the programme in 1980, followed by two new chapters, Julia: The First Year and Julia: My Body, My Choice. A revised version aired in 1994, accompanied by another new chapter, The Untold Story, which updates viewers on Julia's life of the past 15 years. The final instalment, Julia Gets Her Man, followed in 1999. David Pearson directed the films.

Julia Grant was born in 1954. The documentary introduces us to her as George Roberts, a catering manager. Although she performs as a drag queen, George says she has never felt at home in gay male culture. She feels inside that she is a woman, and she wishes for sex reassignment surgery. The National Health Service refers her to the Gender Identity Clinic at Charing Cross Hospital. As she sits in the consulting room, we hear the voice of her psychiatrist, but we never see his face. His attitude toward Grant is stern and disparaging. His deskside manner was the inspiration for the character Dr Ira Carlton, a "despotic GP who rules his patients with eccentric zeal" in the black comedy series The League of Gentlemen.

Beyond the consulting room, the filmmakers follow Julia through her experiences of hormone therapy, shopping for women's clothing, gender confirmation surgeries, her professional life, and other dimensions of her transition.

Julia Grant died on 2 January 2019, aged 64.

Production and broadcast
A Change of Sex began as an episode of Inside Story, a documentary television series oriented toward investigative journalism. There was sufficient interest in the episode, titled George, for Pearson to explore Grant's story further. He and his crew filmed her progress in 1979 and 1980. George was retitled George: The Big Decision, and the more recent footage was edited into two new chapters: Julia: The First Year and Julia: My Body, My Choice. This three-film series was titled A Change of Sex, and BBC2 broadcast it in October 1980. New English Library published Grant's autobiography, George and Julia, that same month.

In 1993, Pearson revisited Grant to film a fourth chapter of the documentary about her life. Filming and editing continued into 1994, but the earlier programmes were also edited in order to make a four-part story into a trilogy: George & Julia, Desperate Measures, and The Untold Story. This revised version of A Change of Sex aired on BBC2 in August 1994. The broadcast coincided with the publication of Grant's second memoir, Just Julia: The Story of an Extraordinary Woman.

In 1998, Pearson filmed Grant once more. BBC2 repeated the 1994 edition of the previous films in July and August 1999 before broadcasting the final chapter, Julia Gets Her Man. It updates viewers on developments in Grant's life over the past four years, including a new job and a growing relationship.

Broadcast history

George (Inside Story episode)

A Change of Sex

Reception and legacy 

The psychiatrist's deskside manner was the inspiration for the character Dr Ira Carlton, a "despotic GP who rules his patients with eccentric zeal" in the black comedy series The League of Gentlemen.

See also

References

Further reading

External links
 
 

Biographical documentary films
Transgender-related documentary films
Transgender-related television shows
Transgender in the United Kingdom
Documentary films about businesspeople
Documentary films about women in the United Kingdom
1970s British LGBT-related television series
1970s English-language films